Navtej Singh Johar   v. Union of India  Secretary Ministry of Law and Justice (2018) is a landmark decision of the Supreme Court of India that decriminalised all consensual sex among adults, including homosexual sex.

The court was asked to determine the constitutionality of Section 377 of the Indian Penal Code, a colonial-era law which, among other things, criminalised homosexual acts as an "unnatural offence". While the statute criminalises all anal sex and oral sex, including between opposite-sex couples, it largely affected same-sex relationships. On 6 September 2018, the court unanimously declared the law unconstitutional "in so far as it criminalises consensual sexual conduct between adults of the same sex". The verdict was hailed as a landmark decision for LGBT rights in India, with campaigners waiting outside the court cheering after the verdict was pronounced.

Elements of Section 377 relating to sex with minors, non-consensual sexual acts such as rape, and bestiality remain in force.

Background 
On 27 April 2016, five people filed a new writ petition in the Supreme Court challenging the constitutionality of Section 377 of the Indian Penal Code. The petitioners claimed that the issues which they raised in their petition were varied and diverse from those raised in the pending curative petition in the 2013 Koushal v. Naz case, in which the Supreme Court had upheld the constitutionality of Section 377. The Naz had been earlier referred to a five-judge bench in order to decide whether the curative petition could be accepted for consideration. The petitioners were dancer Navtej Singh Johar, journalist Sunil Mehra, chef Ritu Dalmia, hoteliers Aman Nath and Keshav Suri, and businesswoman Ayesha Kapur. This case was the first instance wherein the petitioners argued that they had all been directly aggrieved because of Section 377, alleging it to be a direct violation of fundamental rights. The opposition to decriminalisation petitions was led by Apostolic Alliance of Churches, Utkal Christian Council and Trust God Ministries. Advocate Manoj George represented the first two and Senior Advocate KS Radhakrishnan the third. The NDA government took a neutral stance, leaving the decision to the “wisdom of the court” as long as it applies to “consensual acts of adults in private”.

Trial
The petition was first placed before the former Chief Justice of India Justice T.S. Thakur, Justice S. A. Bobde and Justice A. K. Bhushan on 29 June 2016. An order was passed to post the matter before Justice Dipak Misra for appropriate orders since a curative petition was already pending before the constitution bench. On 8 January 2018, the case (Navtej Singh Johar and others v. Union of India) was listed to be heard by the Chief Justice's bench, which passed an order stating that the case would be heard by a constitution bench.

The matter was heard from 17 January 2018 by a five-judge constitution bench of the Supreme Court. On 10 July 2018, the SC commenced hearing of the pleas challenging the constitutionality of section 377. The bench ended its hearing on 17 July and reserved its verdict, asking for both sides to submit written submissions for their claims by 20 July.

Judgment 

On 6 September 2018, the court delivered its unanimous verdict, declaring portions of the law relating to consensual sexual acts between adults unconstitutional. This decision overturns the 2013 ruling in Suresh Kumar Koushal v. Naz Foundation in which the court upheld the law. However, other portions of Section 377 relating to sex with minors, non-consensual sexual acts, and bestiality remain in force.

The court found that the criminalisation of sexual acts between consenting adults violated the right to equality guaranteed by the Constitution of India. While reading the judgment, the then Chief Justice of India Dipak Misra pronounced that the court found "criminalising carnal intercourse" to be "irrational, arbitrary and manifestly unconstitutional". The court ruled that LGBT people in India are entitled to all constitutional rights, including the liberties protected by the Constitution of India. It held that "the choice of whom to partner, the ability to find fulfilment in sexual intimacies and the right not to be subjected to discriminatory behaviour are intrinsic to the constitutional protection of sexual orientation". "History owes an apology to the members of this community and their families, for the delay in providing redressal for the ignominy and ostracism that they have suffered through the centuries. The members of this community were compelled to live a life full of fear of reprisal and persecution. This was on account of the ignorance of the majority to recognise that homosexuality is a completely natural condition, part of a range of human sexuality." said Hon'ble Justice Indu Malhotra. The judgement also made note that LGBT community is entitled to equal citizenship and protection under law, without discrimination.

Public opinion and specific reactions 
The Government of India decided to abstain from the hearings and had left the matter to the "[w]isdom of the [c]ourt".

Political parties and organisations 
The largest constituent party of the National Democratic Alliance, a right-wing coalition, currently having a majority in the Lok Sabha (House of the People), the Bharatiya Janata Party (BJP), was one of the few parties which officially stayed silent on the verdict. Several party members did express their personal opinions on the subject, including the BJP spokesperson G. V. L. Narasimha Rao, who said that any decision on the matter "takes in sync with the jurisprudential developments on gay rights the world over would be welcome". Meanwhile, Subramanian Swamy, a Rajya Sabha (Council of the States) member of the BJP, attacked the decision, questioning if the court will legalise sexual intercourse with animals in the name of personal liberty. He was of the view that the decision could be overruled "[i]f it leads to excesses, including paedophilia, gay bars, increase in HIV cases, etc." The Prime Minister of India, Narendra Modi, has a record of saying relatively little about LGBT rights compared to other socio-political issues, and refused to comment on the same.

The right-wing organisation Rashtriya Swayamsevak Sangh conveyed its agreement with the court's verdict as it didn't believe homosexuality was a crime, but did label the orientation as "unnatural". In January 2018, the BJP's coalition partner, the Shiv Sena had supported legalisation, with its member and a member of parliament in Lok Sabha for Mumbai South, Arvind Sawant Ganpat saying, "They have the right to live the way they want. What can we say on it."

The largest opposition party in India, the Indian National Congress of the United Progressive Alliance, issued a statement welcoming the ruling. The organisation remarked that the judgement should bring about "the beginning of a more equal and inclusive society". This was in contrast to its previous objection in the same case in 2009 when it was in government during the initial Naz Foundation case, stating that gay sex was 'immoral' and that it cannot be decriminalised.

Overseas
In terms of non-governmental organisations, the group Human Rights Watch welcomed what happened, with its South Asia director labelling the judgement as "hugely significant". Amnesty International also praised the ruling. The United Nations welcomed the judgement, hoping that it will be the first step towards guaranteeing the full range of fundamental rights to LGBTI persons.

Global News suggested that similar colonial laws in South Asia, modelled on India's Section 377, could be declared unconstitutional following this verdict. The agency stated that the ruling "emboldened activists in neighbouring countries". In terms of LGBT rights in Sri Lanka, a similar law in that nation, which has not been enforced in decades, was declared unenforceable by its Supreme Court and is effectively dormant. However, differences in how constitutional matters are handled mean that the law cannot be removed without the consent of the electorate. Global News also noted that the nations of Bangladesh, Myanmar, and Pakistan face problems with LGBT people suffering from public discrimination, outside of the context of laws restricting homosexuality.

Simon Chesterman, dean of the National University of Singapore Faculty of Law, congratulated India on the verdict in a Facebook post. In response to Chesterman's post, Singaporean diplomat Tommy Koh wrote on Facebook that Singaporean LGBT activists should take the opportunity to overturn Section 377A of the Penal Code, a position supported by Chief of Government Communications Janadas Devan. Later, on September 10, disc jockey and producer Johnson Ong Ming filed a lawsuit in court against Section 377A. However, Law and Home Affairs Minister K. Shanmugam stated that “[t]his issue relates to social mores, values - so can you impose viewpoints on a majority when it so closely relates to a social value system?”

See also
 LGBT rights in India 
 List of landmark court decisions in India
 S Sushma v. Commissioner of Police (2021)
Chinmayee Jena v. State of Odisha (2020)
Justice K. S. Puttaswamy (Retd.) v. Union Of India (2017)

Similar landmark decisions in other countries
 Lawrence v. Texas
 Jones v. Trinidad and Tobago

References

Further reading

External links

Supreme Court of India cases
LGBT rights in India
2018 in case law
Indian LGBT rights case law
2018 in India
2018 in LGBT history